The Missionaries of the Poor is a Roman Catholic monastic religious institute of Brothers and Sisters dedicated to "Joyful Service with Christ on the Cross"  to serve the poorest of the poor. Its members use the nominal letters MOP (which is the acronym of its Latin name) after their names to indicate membership in the congregation.  It was started in 1981 by The Very Reverend Father Richard Ho Lung, M.O.P. in Kingston, Jamaica and has now grown to over 550 Brothers and Sisters from 13 countries.

Description
Their headquarters is in Kingston, Jamaica, where they maintain seven mission homes for destitute persons, including abandoned sick, disabled, or dying men, women, infants, and children. They also operate in India (Andhra Pradesh and Orissa), the Philippines (Naga City and Cebu and Manila), Haiti (Cap-Haïtien and Port-au-Prince), Uganda (Kampala), Kenya (Nairobi), (Indonesia), (East Timor), and the United States (Monroe, North Carolina).

One of the most striking characteristics of the life and works of MOP is the award-winning Caribbean-style Christian music that they produce.  Most songs are written by Father Ho Lung and performed by Father Ho Lung & Friends. The music generates revenue for the mission.

The brothers and sisters, who give away all personal belongings, take vows of poverty, chastity, obedience and free service to the least of our brothers and sisters. Everything is done in community including praying, eating, sleeping, and traveling. All their daily activities revolve around prayer, service and worship. More than just giving aid with food, clothing and shelter, the Missionaries of the Poor are dedicated to building up the Church and spreading the Faith. Dedicated to the Holy Rosary, they wear the beads on their sashes, and it was on the feast of the Holy Rosary in 1997 that the Holy See recognized them as a religious community. In November, 2014, the Vatican elevated the MOP to an Institute of Pontifical Right.

Ho Lung stepped down as leader of MOP in 2014, with Brother Augusto Silot succeeding him. Succeeding Brother Augusto was Brother Anil Minj.

See also
Missionaries of Charity

References

External links
Missionaries of the Poor website
 St Georges College
 The Catholic Company

Catholic charities
Christian organizations established in 1981
Catholic Church in Jamaica
Catholic missionary orders
Catholic religious institutes established in the 20th century
Members of the Order of Jamaica
Charities based in Jamaica